Kyle Teel (born February 15, 2002) is an American college baseball catcher for the Virginia Cavaliers.

Amateur career
Teel grew up in Mahwah, New Jersey and attended Mahwah High School. He batted .574 with eight home runs and 31 RBIs as a junior. Teel was named the New Jersey Gatorade Player of the Year during his senior year. He also was the starting quarterback of Mahwah's football team. He was considered a top high school catching prospects in the 2020 Major League Baseball draft, but opted out. Teel played summer collegiate baseball after graduating high school for the Wisconsin Rapids Rafters of the Northwoods League.

Teel played as a designated hitter, outfielder, and catcher as a freshman at Virginia and was named third-team All-Atlantic Coast Conference (ACC) after batting .335 with 70 hits, nine home runs, and 41 RBIs. He batted .276 with 12 doubles, six home runs, and 45 RBIs during his sophomore season. After the season, Teel was selected to play for the United States collegiate national team. He entered his junior season as a projected first round pick in the 2023 Major League Baseball draft.

References

External links

Virginia Cavaliers bio

2002 births
Living people
Baseball players from New Jersey
Baseball catchers
Mahwah High School alumni
People from Mahwah, New Jersey
People from Ridgewood, New Jersey
Sportspeople from Bergen County, New Jersey
Virginia Cavaliers baseball players